Dowkestan (also Romanized as Dowkestān and Dūkestān) is a village in Gevar Rural District, Sarduiyeh District, Jiroft County, Kerman Province, Iran. At the 2006 census, its population was 91, in 20 families.

References 

Populated places in Jiroft County